Tara Sutaria (born 19 November 1995) is an Indian actress who works in Hindi films. She began her career as a singer in Disney India's Big Bada Boom and transitioned to acting with the channel's sitcoms The Suite Life of Karan & Kabir (2012) and Oye Jassie (2013). Sutaria made her film debut in 2019 with Student of the Year 2, for which she won Zee Cine Award for Best Female Debut.

She has since starred as the leading lady in the romantic dramas Marjaavaan (2019), Tadap (2021), Heropanti 2 (2022) and Ek Villain Returns (2022).

Early life and education
Tara Sutaria was born on 19 November 1995 into a Parsi Zoroastrian family in Mumbai. She has a twin sister named Pia. Both trained in classical ballet, modern dance and Latin American dances at the School of Classical Ballet and Western Dance, Royal Academy of Dance, United Kingdom and the Imperial Society for Teachers of Dancing, United Kingdom. She has been a professional singer since she was seven years old, having sung in operas and competitions since then. She received a bachelor's degree in Mass Media from St. Andrew's College of Arts, Science and Commerce.

Career

Television career (2010–2013)
Sutaria started her association with Disney Channel India as a video jockey and continued to be associated with them, having two successful sitcoms to her credit. She has also been recording music in India and abroad for films, advertisements, and her own original work. Her song "Slippin' Through My Fingers" is part of the Ashwin Gidwani Production of Bharat Dhabholkar's Blame It On Yashraj. She has also played the lead role of Sandy in Raell Padamsee's production of the musical Grease. 

She has recorded and performed solo concerts in London, Tokyo, Lavasa and Mumbai. She has performed with Louiz Banks, Mikey McCleary and has also been a soloist for the Stop-Gaps Choral Ensemble, singing at the NCPA for over a decade. She was one of the top seven finalists of the 2008 "Pogo Amazing Kids Awards" in the singer category. She received recognition for her roles of Vinnie in The Suite Life of Karan & Kabir and Jassie in Oye Jassie.

Film career (2019–present)

Sutaria was among two actresses selected for the part of Princess Jasmine in the American fantasy film Aladdin (2019), but lost the role to Naomi Scott. She made her film debut later that year with Punit Malhotra's coming-of-age teen film Student of the Year 2 alongside Tiger Shroff and Ananya Panday. Produced by Karan Johar, it served as a standalone sequel to Student of the Year (2012) and narrates the story of a college student (portrayed by Shroff) who competes to win an annual school championship. Reviewing the film for The Indian Express, Shubhra Gupta wrote, "Tara Sutaria is perfectly put together and yet looks assembly-line produced". She received a nomination for the Filmfare Award for Best Female Debut. It did not perform well commercially.

Later in 2019, Sutaria played the role of Zoya, a mute music teacher, alongside Sidharth Malhotra, Riteish Deshmukh and Rakul Preet Singh, in Milap Zaveri's action film Marjaavaan. The film was decently successful having a worldwide gross of ₹65.35 crores. In a scathing review for The Hindu, Namrata Joshi found the film to be "loud, overcooked and overdone" and wrote that Sutaria was reduced to "smiling and weeping alternately".

In 2021 Sutaria and debutante Ahan Shetty starred in the Milan Luthria directed romantic thriller Tadap, a remake of Telugu film RX 100 (2018). It received mixed reviews from critics. Rachana Dubey of Times of India wrote, "Tadap unabashedly plays to the gallery with action, music, and well-shot visuals, she further praised the performances of Shetty, Sutaria and Shukla".

In her first release of 2022, she reunited again with Shroff in Ahmed Khan's actioner Heropanti 2 which received negative reviews from critics and was a commercial failure. In July 2022 the same year, she starred as Aarvi Malhotra opposite Arjun Kapoor in Mohit Suri's psychological suspense action thriller film Ek Villain Returns which also starring John Abraham and Disha Patani. The film received mixed reviews from critics. Sukanya Verma of Rediff.com opined that "Tara Sutaria is exactly how she was in her previous film".

Sutaria will next star in the thriller Apurva.

Media image 

Sutaria supports a number of causes such as animal welfare and feminism. She has ramp walked at the Lakme Fashion Week and has been cover model for various magazines.

Sutaria is a celebrity endorser for several brands and products including Bobbi Brown Cosmetics, Hazoorilal Legacy Jewellers and Nature 4 Nature. She featured alongside Ishaan Khattar for a Nature 4 Nature's adfilm. In Times' 50 Most Desirable Women list, Sutaria ranked 13th in 2019 and 12th in 2020.

Filmography

Films

Television

Music videos

Discography

Awards and nominations

References

External links
 
 

1995 births
Living people
Indian women
Parsi people
Indian women playback singers
Dancers from Maharashtra
Actresses from Mumbai
Actresses in Hindi television
Indian television actresses
21st-century Indian actresses
21st-century Indian women singers
21st-century Indian singers
Indian Zoroastrians
Zee Cine Awards winners